The PUMA (Programmable Universal Machine for Assembly, or Programmable Universal Manipulation Arm) is an industrial robotic arm developed by Victor Scheinman at pioneering robot company Unimation. Initially developed by Unimation for General Motors, the PUMA was based on earlier designs Scheinman invented while at Stanford University based on sponsorship and mentoring from robot inventor George Devol. 

Unimation produced PUMAs for years until being purchased by Westinghouse (ca. 1980), and later by Swiss company Stäubli (1988). Nokia Robotics manufactured about 1500 PUMA robots during the 1980s, the Puma-650 being their most popular model with customers. Some own Nokia Robotics products were also designed, like Nokia NS-16 Industrial Robot or NRS-15 
. Nokia sold their Robotics division in 1990.

In 2002, General Motors Controls, Robotics and Welding (CRW) organization donated the original prototype PUMA robot to the Smithsonian Institution's National Museum of American History.  It joins a collection of historically important robots that includes an early Unimate and the Odetics Odex 1.

The essence of the design is represented in three categories; 200, 500, and 700 series.
The 200 series is a smaller desktop unit. Notably, this model was used for the first robotic stereotactic brain biopsy in 1985.
The 500 Series and can reach almost 2 meters up.  This model is the more popular design and is the most recognizable configuration.
The 700 series is the largest of the group and was intended for assembly line, paint, and welding work.

All designs consist of two main components: the mechanical arm and the control system.  These are typically interconnected by one or two large multi-conductor cables. When two cables are used, one carries power to the servo motors and brakes while the second carries the position feedback for each joint back to the control system.

The control computer is based on the LSI-11 architecture which is very similar to PDP11 computers. The system has a boot program and basic debug tool loaded on ROM chips. The operating system is loaded from external storage through a serial port, usually from a floppy disk.

The control unit also contains the servo power supply, analog and digital feedback processing boards, and servo drive system.

The arm appears in the film Innerspace. An arm was displayed in the "Bird And The Robot" attraction at the World of Motion pavilion of EPCOT.

Model 260
 Six-axis arm with 3 axis making up a spherical wrist
 Maximum reach 400 mm from center axis to center of wrist 
 Maximum payload: 2.2 kg
 Arm weight: 13.2 kg
 Repeatability ±0.05 mm 
 max velocity: 1245 mm/sec straight line moves

Model 560 C

 6 Axis arm with 3 axis making up a spherical wrist.
 Maximum reach 878mm from center axis to center of wrist 
 Software selectable payloads from 4 kg to 2.5 kg 
 Arm weight: 83 kg  (approximate)
 Repeatability ±0.1mm
 2.5 kg max velocity: 500mm/sec straight line moves 
 4.0 kg max velocity: 470mm/sec straight line moves

Model 761 and 762

 6 Axis arm with 3 axis making up a spherical wrist. 
 Maximum reach 
   761: 1.50m from center axis to center of wrist 
   762: 1.25m from center axis to center of wrist
 Arm mass: 
   761: 600 kg   
   762: 590 kg   
 Payload:
   761:  10 kg
   762: 20 kg 
 Repeatability ±0.2mm
 max velocity: 1000mm/sec straight line moves

Control system
Variable Assembly Language

References

Books that Reference the PUMA design
"Essentials of Mechatronics" Billingsley,John. John Wiley & Sons. Hoboken, NJ. 2006  Ch.9
"Robot Modeling and Kinematics" Manseur,Rachid. DaVinci Engineering Press. Boston, MA. 2006  Ch.4-5
"Robotics Technology and Flexible Automation 2nd Edition" S.R. Deb. McGraw Hill. New Delhi. 2010

External links

Stäubli Robotics
Film from 1981 titled 'PUMA...The Leading Edge in Robotic Technology' produced by Unimation, Inc.

Industrial robots
1975 robots
Robotics at Unimation